Zhanghua may refer to:

Taiwan 
 Changhua City, or Zhanghua from its pinyin name, the seat of Changhua County
 Changhua County, located in central Taiwan

Mainland China 
 Zhanghua, Hunan, a town of Huarong County
 Zhanghua, Shandong, town of Pingyuan County